RSML may refer to:

 16S rRNA (cytidine1402-2'-O)-methyltransferase, an enzyme
 Republican Scientific Medical Library